Jacob Zallel Lauterbach (1873–1942) was an American Judaica scholar and author who served on the faculty of Hebrew Union College and composed responsa for the Reform movement in America.  He specialized in Midrashic and Talmudical literature, and is best known for his landmark critical edition and English translation of the Mekilta de-Rabbi Ishmael.

Life and work

Jacob Z. Lauterbach was first and foremost a talmudist .  However, he was thoroughly familiar with all the modern techniques of critical scholarship, including manuscript comparison and decryption.  After retiring from his position at Hebrew Union College, he continued to live at the College and to mentor students.

Among his scholarly publications may be listed the following.
"The Talmud and Reform Judaism" (1911), American Israelite 58(18):p. 1.
"The attitude of the Jew towards the non-Jew" (1921), C.C.A.R. Yearbook 31:186–233.
"A significant controversy between the Sadducees and the Pharisees" (1927), HUCA 4:173–205.
"Is it permissible to let a non-Jewish contractor, building a synagogue, work on the building on the Sabbath?" [A responsum] (1927), C.C.A.R. Yearbook 37:202–206.
"Should one cover the head when participating in divine worship?" [A responsum] (1928), C.C.A.R. Yearbook 38:589–603.
"Talmudic-rabbinic view on birth control" [A responsum] (1927), C.C.A.R. Yearbook 37:369–384.
Mekilta de-Rabbi Ishmael: A Critical Edition on the Basis of the Manuscripts and Early Editions with an English Translation, Introduction, and Notes (1933)

References
.
.

1873 births
1942 deaths
Hebrew Union College – Jewish Institute of Religion faculty
American Jews
Hildesheimer Rabbinical Seminary alumni